Visions: All Areas Volume 19 is a compilation album released on August 27, 2001 and bundled with the Visions Magazine, issue #102.

Track listing
"60 Miles Per Hour" - New Order (4:33)
"Prison Song" - System of a Down (3:24)
"Masterplan" - Solarez (3:35)
"The Modern Age" - The Strokes (3:27)
"Your Number is One" - Rollins Band (4:27)
"Long Line of Cars" - Cake (3:23)
"Last Man Standing" - Biohazard (3:19)
"The Slow Phaseout" - Motorpsycho (4:29)
"Nothing Happens (For a Reason)" - I Saw Elvis (3:05)
"Uneasy" - Desert Sun (4:06)
"Bay" - The Fullbliss (4:35)
"Bleed American" - Jimmy Eat World (Video)
"Too Hard To Be Free" - Amen (Video)

2001 compilation albums